Serhiy Mykolayovych Hamal is a Ukrainian retired footballer.

Career
Serhiy Hamal is a pupil of the Chernivtsi Sports School Bukovyna Chernivtsi; he began his professional career in 1994 in his native Bukovyna Chernivtsi. He made his debut in the top league of Ukraine on March 12 of the same year in a match against Kryvbas Kryvyi Rih. In 1995 he was called up to serve in the armed forces of Ukraine, where he was sent to the central sports club of the army. At the end of his service life, Sergei returned to Bukovina.

In connection with the unsuccessful 2000/01 season, in which Bukovyna Chernivtsi took the last place in the first league, Hamal, like a number of other players, left his home club. He continued his career at the Nafkom Brovary, and in 2001 he played for the Cherkassy team. From 2003 to 2006 he played for his native Bukovyna Chernivtsi and January 2004 he moved to Desna Chernihiv, where he with the club of Chernihiv he won the Ukrainian Second League in the season 2005–06. In 2007, as a member of the Luzhany club, he became the bronze medalist of the amateur championship of Ukraine. After that, in the summer of 2007, he returned to his native team, where he played two seasons and ended his professional career as a player.

In 2017, already as a coach of a youth sports school, he got a job in the same Bukovyna Chernivtsi, namely, he helped the director of the school, Yuri Kraftruuk, with the coaching process. In December 2018, he entered the coaching staff of Vitaly Kunitsa, who had headed Bukovyna Chernivtsi the day before. Also, Sergei Nikolaevich simultaneously became the mentor of the youth team, which played in the all-Ukrainian junior league.

Personal life
He is married, married to Oksana Hamal and has a daughter, Alexandra.

Honours
Desna Chernihiv
 Ukrainian Second League: 2005–06

Nafkom Brovary
 Ukrainian Second League: 2002–03

Bukovyna Chernivtsi
 Ukrainian Second League: 1999–2000

CSKA Kyiv
 Ukrainian Second League: 1995–96

References

External links 
 Serhiy Hamal at footballfacts.ru
 Serhiy Hamal at allplayers.in.ua
 

1976 births
Living people
Sportspeople from Chernivtsi
Ukrainian footballers
Association football midfielders
FC Bukovyna Chernivtsi players
FC CSKA Kyiv players
FC Dnipro Cherkasy players
FC Nafkom Brovary players
FC Desna Chernihiv players
FC Hirnyk-Sport Horishni Plavni players
FC Lada Chernivtsi players
FC Luzhany players
Ukrainian Premier League players
Ukrainian First League players
Ukrainian Second League players
Ukrainian Amateur Football Championship players